The Vertamocorii (Gaulish: *Wertamocorī) were a Celtic people that lived in Cisalpine Gaul around Novara, in Eastern Piedmont (Italy).

The Vertamocorii are reported by Pliny in the third book of Naturalis Historia, where they are said to be the founders of the city of Novara:

and indicates their Gaulish origin (the Vocontii were a people of Gallia Narbonensis) and not Ligurian.

See also
 Ancient peoples of Italy

References

External links
 Teuta Vertamocori - Group of historical reconstruction from Novara 

Historical Celtic peoples
Gauls
Ancient peoples of Italy
Novara